Karen C. Bash is an American politician, pastor, educator, and businesswoman who served as a member of the New Mexico House of Representatives for the 68th district from 2019 to 2023.

Early life and education 
Bash is a native of Albuquerque, New Mexico. She earned a Bachelor of Arts from Phillips University, Master of Education from Lamar University, and Masters of Divinity from the Dubuque Theological Seminary.

Career 
Prior to entering politics, Bash worked as a Methodist pastor and operated a bed and breakfast. From 1977 to 1979, she worked as an early childhood teacher and later managed a halfway house. A member of the Democratic Party, Bash defeated Republican incumbent Monica Youngblood in the 2018 election for a seat in the New Mexico House of Representatives and assumed office on January 15, 2019.

References 

Women state legislators in New Mexico
Phillips University alumni
Lamar University alumni
People from Albuquerque, New Mexico
Year of birth missing (living people)
Living people
Democratic Party members of the New Mexico House of Representatives
21st-century American politicians
21st-century American women politicians